The 1942–43 Penn State Nittany Lions men's ice hockey season was the 4th season of play for the program. The Nittany Lions represented Pennsylvania State University and were coached by Arthur Davis in his 3rd season.

Season
With World War II in full force, many ice hockey programs suspended operations. Penn State tried to muddle through with a shortened season that didn't begin until February. On top of other issues, the Nittany Lions still weren't able to schedule any other varsity program, having played just one varsity game since the team was restarted in 1940.

Roster

Standings

Schedule and Results

|-
!colspan=12 style=";" | Regular Season

Scoring Statistics

Note: Only the goal scorers in the Drexel games were counted.

References

External links

Penn State Nittany Lions men's ice hockey seasons
Penn State
Penn State
Penn State
Penn State